The Keluarga Malaysia (English: 'Malaysian family') was an idea introduced by Ismail Sabri Yaakob on 22 August 2021 in his inaugural speech as prime minister. It was officially launched on 23 October 2021 in Kuching, Sarawak. This idea encouraged Malaysians to put aside their differences and work together to rebuild the nation in order to combat the COVID-19 pandemic and achieve the Shared Prosperity Vision 2030.

When Anwar Ibrahim was appointed as prime minister in 2022, the Keluarga Malaysia concept was abolished and replaced with his own idea, Malaysia Madani in 2023.

Overview 
The Keluarga Malaysia concept was first announced as a national agenda by the then Deputy Prime Minister, Wan Azizah Wan Ismail in November 2019 a few months before the political crisis occurred. However, it was officially introduced as an idea by Ismail Sabri Yaakob in his inaugural speech as the ninth Prime Minister of Malaysia on 22 August 2021. According to Ismail Sabri, this concept is inclusive across the boundaries of religion, race and race and invites all citizens in this country together as a whole family. This concept was chosen because it is "inclusive, close to the people and shows a value of concern and love for all members of the country's big family". Ismail Sabri in his speech said:

Core 
The concept of 'Keluarga Malaysia' outlines 3 main cores and 20 value enrichment that underlies the new kingdom led by Ismail Sabri, to work together in recovering the country from the problems and effects of the COVID-19 pandemic. The three main cores are Inclusion, Togetherness and Gratitude.

References 

2021 in Malaysia
2022 in Malaysia
Public policy in Malaysia
Malaysian political slogans